The Bateau-Lavoir ("Washhouse Boat") is the nickname of a building in the Montmartre district of the 18th arrondissement of Paris that is famous in art history as the residence and meeting place for a group of outstanding early 20th-century artists, men of letters, theatre people, and art dealers. It is located at No. 13 Rue Ravignan at Place Emile Goudeau, just below the Place du Tertre.

A fire destroyed most of the building in May 1970 and only the façade remained, but it was completely rebuilt in 1978.

History

Formerly a ballroom and piano factory, Bateau Lavoir was squatted and divided into 20 small workshops in 1889. Distributed along a corridor, small rooms were linked without heating and with a single point of water. The name "Le Bateau-Lavoir" was coined by French poet Max Jacob. The building was dark and dirty, almost seeming to be scrap pile rather than a dwelling. On stormy days, it swayed and creaked, reminding people of washing-boats on the Seine River, hence the name.

The building stands on a small cobblestone square that was known as Place Ravignan. In 1911, it was rechristened Place Émile Goudeau for Émile Goudeau (1849–1906), a popular novelist, poet, and journalist who founded Les Hydropathes, a renowned and famous literary club. The square now has a Wallace fountain and is planted with horse chestnut trees.

Maxime Maufra (1863–1918) was the first noted artist to take up residence in Bateau-Lavoir, around 1890. Kees van Dongen and Pablo Picasso took up residence between 1900 and 1904. After 1904 more artists and writers moved in, including Otto van Rees, Amedeo Modigliani, Pierre Mac Orlan, Juan Gris, André Salmon, Pablo Gargallo, Max Jacob and Pierre Reverdy.

It became an unofficial club that included artists Henri Matisse, Georges Braque, André Derain, Raoul Dufy, Marie Laurencin, Modigliani, Jean-Paul Laurens, Maurice Utrillo, Jacques Lipchitz, María Blanchard, Jean Metzinger and Louis Marcoussis; writers Guillaume Apollinaire, Alfred Jarry, Jean Cocteau, Gustave Coquiot, Cremnitz (Maurice Chevrier), Paul Fort, André Warnod, Raymond Radiguet, and Gertrude Stein; actors Charles Dullin, Harry Baur, and Gaston Modot; and art dealers Ambroise Vollard, Clovis Sagot, Daniel-Henry Kahnweiler, and Berthe Weill.

While residing at the Bateau-Lavoir, Picasso painted works such as Young Girl with a Flower Basket, and Garçon à la pipe (Boy with a Pipe) in 1905, and one of his most noted works, Les Demoiselles d'Avignon in 1907, considered by art historians as a proto-Cubist painting (the precursor of a movement that became known as Cubism).

Following the outbreak of World War I in 1914, creative artists living at the Bateau-Lavoir and in the neighbourhood began moving elsewhere, mainly to Montparnasse.

Notable residents
 Guillaume Apollinaire
 Georges Braque
 Jose De Creeft
 Tibor Csernus
 Kees van Dongen
 Otto Freundlich
 Pablo Gargallo 
 Juan Gris
 Auguste Herbin
 Max Jacob
 Pierre Mac Orlan
 Maxime Maufra
 Ksenia Milicevic
 Igor Mitoraj
 Amedeo Modigliani
 Fernande Olivier
 Pablo Picasso
 Augusta Preitinger
 Adya van Rees-Dutilh
 Otto van Rees
 Pierre Reverdy
 Endre Rozsda
 André Salmon
 Ardengo Soffici
 Marie Laurencin

Notable events

In 1908, a celebration banquet for Henri Rousseau was organised in Picasso's studio in the Bateau-Lavoir.

One night, Amedeo Modigliani destroyed a number of his friends' paintings while in an alcoholic rage in the Bateau-Lavoir, according to memoirs of his daughter, Jeanne.

In popular culture
The Le Bateau-Lavoir is a featured setting in the 2018 season of Genius, which focuses on the life and art of Pablo Picasso.

It is also featured in the 1995 Eric Rohmer film Les Rendez-vous de Paris.

See also 
 La Ruche, in Montparnasse, Paris

References

External links
 "Cubism Birthplace Bateau-Lavoir" BlogSpot article with additional photographs

Buildings and structures in Paris
French art
History of Paris
Painting in Paris
Buildings and structures in the 18th arrondissement of Paris
Montmartre
Pablo Picasso
Amedeo Modigliani
Guillaume Apollinaire
Burned buildings and structures in France